Drvenik Mali (also called Ploča by local population; is an island in Croatian part of Adriatic Sea. It is situated in middle-Dalmatian archipelago, west of Drvenik Veliki,  from Trogir. The only settlement on the island is the eponymous village with a population of 87. The coast is well indented and sea around the island is shallow, thus convenient for fishing. The highest peak is 79 metres high. Main industries are agriculture (mostly olives), fishing and tourism.

References

Bibliography
 

Islands of Croatia
Islands of the Adriatic Sea
Landforms of Split-Dalmatia County